Grande Fratello is the Italian version of the reality television franchise Big Brother. Begun in September 2000, it has gone on to become a cultural phenomenon in Italy. There have been twenty-one completed seasons as of 2021, sixteen regular seasons and six celebrity seasons.

Format

Based on the original Dutch version created by Endemol, the show sees a number of "housemates", divided by gender, social backgrounds and geographical locations, locked up together in a house, where the viewing public can watch them twenty-four hours a day, and vote them out of the house as they choose.

The housemates can visit the "confessional" at any time during the day, either to talk to psychologists if they need to, talk to "Big Brother", or to nominate.

The title is inspired by the George Orwell novel 1984. The novel tells of a Big Brother, head of the totalitarian state of Oceania that constantly monitors its inhabitants by the camera in an attempt to suppress their free will. The tag line of the novel is "Big Brother is watching you", which inspired the show, as it is Big Brother who now has total control over the situation in the house.

The housemates live in a house 24 hours a day, bugged by numerous cameras and microphones which capture their every move. Every week the housemates participate in tasks that determine their food budget for that week, or could even affect that week's nominations. The overall goal is to be the final surviving housemate and claim the prize fund. A PlayStation game based on this version was released in 2003.

Series details

Popularity
The program has broken several records, including exceeding a 50% share of the ratings (with peaks of 60% during season one). The fifth season recorded a decline in ratings which was put down to both the competition from rival reality television shows and the season's poor and hasty production. By the ninth season, the show recorded increasing ratings which took the program back to its original popularity.

Despite a decline in viewing figures over the years (especially in the twelfth season), Grande Fratello is still one of the most successful reality shows in Italy.

References

External links
Official website

 
2000 Italian television series debuts
2000s Italian television series
2010s Italian television series
Italian reality television series
Canale 5 original programming
Italia 1 original programming